Club General Martín Ledesma, is a Paraguayan football club based in the city of Capiatá in the Central Department. The club was founded 22 September 1914 and plays in the Primera Division B, the third-tier of Paraguayan football. Their home games are played at the Estadio Enrique Soler.

History
The club was founded on September 22, 1914 in the building of the Graduada Doble School under the supervision of the school director Mr. Enrique Soler. In the meeting, it was decided to create an institution to develop the practice of sports in the city of Capiatá and the name "General Martín Ledesma Football Club" was chosen for the institution in honor of the founder of the mentioned city, General Don Martín Ledesma de Balderrama.

The first ever board in 1914 consisted of:
President:  Mr. Juan R. Alcaraz
Vice President:   Mr. Juan B Salcedo
Secretary:  Mr. Venancio Trinidad
Treasurer:   Mr. Alberto Sanchez
Arsenio Ayala, José Sosa, José Emiliano Céspedes, Juan Cappa and José Arrúa were also members of the board.

Honours
Third División
Runner-up (1): 2012
UFI Champions Cup
Winners (1): 2006
Regional Titles (Capiatá league)
Winners (10): 1968, 1970, 1972, 1976, 1985, 1996, 1997, 1998, 1999, 2004

References

External links
Albigol: Martin Ledesma Info

Football clubs in Paraguay
Association football clubs established in 1914
1914 establishments in Paraguay